Éva Kaptur (born 15 November 1987) is a Hungarian athlete competing in sprinting events.

International competitions

Personal bests
Outdoor
100 metres – 11.47 (+1.2 m/s, Budapest 2013)
200 metres – 23.53 (+1.0 m/s, Budapest 2014)
Indoor
60 metres – 7.36 (Budapest 2015)
200 metres - 23.99 (Wien 2014)

References

1987 births
Living people
Hungarian female sprinters
People from Kisvárda
Competitors at the 2009 Summer Universiade
Competitors at the 2011 Summer Universiade
Competitors at the 2015 Summer Universiade
Sportspeople from Szabolcs-Szatmár-Bereg County
21st-century Hungarian women